Thompson–Robbins Airport  is  northwest of the center of Helena-West Helena, in unincorporated Phillips County, Arkansas, United States. It is owned by the City of Helena-West Helena.

The FAA's National Plan of Integrated Airport Systems for 2011–2015 called it a general aviation airport.

Facilities
It has two asphalt runways: 17/35 is 5,000 by 96 feet (1,524 x 29 m) and 8/26 is 3,009 by 60 feet (917 x 18 m).

In the year ending July 31, 2009 the airport had 35,000 aircraft operations, average 95 per day: 97.1% general aviation, 1.4% air taxi, and 1.4% military. Forty-two aircraft were then based at the airport: 79% single-engine, 17% multi-engine, 2% jet, and 2% helicopter.

History

World War II
In preparation for the eventual U.S. entry into World War II, the United States Army Air Corps sought to expand the nation's combat air forces by asking civilian flight schools to provide the primary phase of training for air cadets. The Army Air Corps flying school at Randolph Field, Texas could only graduate 500 pilots a year, and most of the current Air Corps pilots did not have enough flying hours to be instructors.

To address this problem and ramp up training for new pilots, the commanding general of the AAF, Henry Arnold, devised a plan for primary contract flying schools located in local communities. Consequently, it contracted with civilian flying schools to provide primary flying training, with the graduates being moved on to basic and advanced training at regular military training airfields.  The Air Corps would supply the trainees and planes, pay for the training, and buy back the buildings after the schools closed. Local communities often furnished the land.

The cities of Helena (Phillips County) and West Helena acquired 640 acres of land adjoining the existing airport at West Helena for the school.  The flight school was activated as Helena Aero Tech on October 4, 1941. The airfield was dedicated as the Thompson-Robbins Airfield on December 6, 1941, in honor of two Helena flyers killed in AAF flying accidents: Lieutenant Jerome Pillow Thompson, who died on June 17, 1933, and Lieutenant Jack Stewart Robbins, who died on November 8, 1940.  The school was under the jurisdiction of the 59th Flying Training Detachment, 29th Flying Training Wing.  It was equipped with  PT-17 Stearmans as its primary trainer.  In addition Thompson–Robbins field had some Fairchild PT-19 and PT-23s.

The physical facilities of Thompson–Robbins Field included administrative buildings and quarters for officers and enlisted men, encircling a central location. A consolidated mess hall, which accommodated 1,000 enlisted men and a limited number of' officers, was located nearby. Adjacent to the mess hall was a Post Exchange, a Service Club and a dance floor.

It performed contract training until the airfield was inactivated on 4 August 1944 with the drawdown of AAFTC's pilot training program.  3,985 student pilots graduated from the school at Thompson-Robbins.  With the closure of the field, the planes and furniture of the school were to be sold at auction.

The airfield was turned over to civil control at the end of the war though the War Assets Administration (WAA).  Eventually it was discharged to the War Assets Administration (WAA) and became a civil airport.

Civil use
Today, Thompson–Robbins Airport retains much of its World War II past.   The all-way airfield has been replaced by a hard-surfaced runway and taxiway system, however the large wartime parking ramp remains and all five wartime hangars remain and are still in use.    Although nearly all wartime buildings have been torn down or removed from the station,  the wartime streets and main entrance remain, along with many concrete foundation pads of the wartime buildings.   The parade and formation area remain visible, along with the wartime flagpole. 

Airline flights (Trans-Texas DC-3s) ended in 1959.

See also

 Arkansas World War II Army Airfields

References

External links 

 Thompson–Robbins Airport (HEE) at Arkansas Department of Aeronautics
 Aerial image as of 28 February 2001 from USGS The National Map
 
 

Airports in Arkansas
Airfields of the United States Army Air Forces in Arkansas
USAAF Contract Flying School Airfields
Transportation in Phillips County, Arkansas
Buildings and structures in Phillips County, Arkansas
1941 establishments in Arkansas
Airports established in 1941